Henryk Rzewuski (3 May 1791 – 28 February 1866) was a Polish nobleman, Romantic-era journalist and novelist.

Life
Count Henryk Rzewuski was a scion of a Polish magnate family in Ukraine. He was the son of Adam Wawrzyniec Rzewuski, a Russian senator who resided in St. Petersburg; a great-nephew of a Targowica confederate; and great-grandson of Wacław Rzewuski, Polish Great Crown Hetman who had been exiled in 1767–73 to Kaluga by Russian ambassador to the Polish–Lithuanian Commonwealth, Nikolai Repnin, who was effectively running the Commonwealth.

Henryk Rzewuski was, further, the brother of Karolina Sobańska (who became an agent of the Russian secret service and mistress of the Polish poet Adam Mickiewicz), Ewelina Hańska (who married Honoré de Balzac), and Russian General Adam Rzewuski.

In his youth, Rzewuski served in the army of the Duchy of Warsaw, participating in the Duchy's brief 1809 war with Austria. In 1845–50, in St. Petersburg, Russia, with Michał Grabowski he headed a conservative, Russian-aligned "St. Petersburg coterie" and contributed to the Polish Tygodnik Petersburski (The St. Petersburg Weekly).

In 1850–56 Rzewuski, an advocate of the closest Polish-Russian political collaboration, worked with Russian Imperial Viceroy Ivan Paskevich, and in 1851–56 he edited Dziennik Warszawki (The Warsaw Daily).

Rzewuski had traveled much—in 1825, to Crimea, together with Mickiewicz. He had later met the poet in Rome and had enthralled him with stories of the old Polish nobility, helping inspire Mickiewicz's great verse epic, Pan Tadeusz. Rzewuski's tales would later similarly influence Henryk Sienkiewicz's historical novels set in Poland (The Trilogy).
The same influence he had in historical novels wrote by Teodor Jeske-Choiński.
The Russian Empire's suppression of the Polish November 1830 Uprising and the ensuing repression, by the three partitioning powers, of Polish culture, education and politics had forced Polish writers to seek a collective identity in their country's past. This had created a new vogue for the Polish gawęda, which had antecedents in Poland's 17th-century memoirists. The gawęda is a discursive fiction in which the narrator recounts incidents in a highly stylized personal language. It was this genre of which Henryk Rzewuski was the past master.

Czesław Miłosz characterizes Rzewuski as a literary figure:

Works
 Pamiątki Soplicy (The Memoirs of Soplica; full title: Pamiątki JPana Seweryna Soplicy, cześnika parnawskiego; 1839, 4 volumes; critical edition by Zygmunt Szweykowski, 1928); revised for the censors as Pamiętniki starego szlachcica litewskiego (Memoirs of an Old Lithuanian Nobleman; 1844–45)
 Mieszaniny obyczajowe (Assorted Customs; 1841–43), published under the pen name "Jarosz Bejła"
 Listopad (November; 1845–46), 3-volume novel; critical edition by K. Wojciechowski, 1923; translated into Czech, Russian, German, English; a superb picture of Polish society, artfully styled and constructed, with masterfully crafted characters.   
 Zamek krakowski (The Kraków Castle; 1847–48)
 Teofrast polski (A Polish Theophrastus; 1851)
 Adam Śmigielski (1851)
 Rycerz Lizdejko (The Knight Lizdejko; 1852)
 Zaporożec (The Zaporozhian; 1854)
 Pamiętniki Bartłomieja Michałowskiego (The Memoirs of Bartłomiej Michałowski; 1855—57)
 Próbki historyczne (Historic Samples; 1868)
 Uwagi o dawnej Polsce przez starego Szlachcica Seweryna Soplicę Cześnika Parnawskiego napisane 1832 r. (Remarks about Old Poland Written in 1832 by the Old Nobleman Seweryn Soplica...; manuscript, published in 2003)

See also
Polish Romanticism
Polish literature
Gawęda
List of Poles

Notes

References
Czesław Miłosz, The History of Polish Literature, 2nd ed., Berkeley, University of California Press, 1983, .
"Rzewuski, Henryk," Encyklopedia Powszechna PWN (PWN Universal Encyclopedia), Warsaw, Państwowe Wydawnictwo Naukowe, vol. 4, 1976, p. 106.
Jan Zygmunt Jakubowski, ed., Literatura polska od średniowiecza do pozytywizmu (Polish Literature from the Middle Ages to Positivism), Warsaw, Państwowe Wydawnictwo Naukowe, 1979, pp. 480–81 and passim. 
"Gawęda," Encyklopedia Polski (Encyclopedia of Poland), Kraków, Wydawnictwo Ryszard Kluszczyński, 1996, p. 175.
Zygmunt Szweykowski, Powieści historyczne Henryka Rzewuskiego (The Historical Novels of Henryk Rzewuski), 1922.
Andrzej Ślisz, Henryk Rzewuski: Życie i poglądy (Henryk Rzewuski: Life and Views), Warsaw, Krajowa Agencja Wydawnicza, 1986.

External links
 Henryk Rzewuski, Pamiątki JPana Seweryna Soplicy, cześnika parnawskiego

Polish male novelists
Polish journalists
Polish conservatives
19th-century Polish nobility
Henryk
1791 births
1866 deaths
People from Slavuta
19th-century Polish novelists
People from the Russian Empire of Polish descent
19th-century Polish male writers